Scott Dyson is a professional rugby league footballer who played in the 2000s.

International honours
Dyson won a cap for Ireland while at Gateshead Thunder 2001 1-cap (sub).

References

Newcastle Thunder players
Ireland national rugby league team players
Living people
Place of birth missing (living people)
Rugby league five-eighths
Year of birth missing (living people)